Askhat Shakharov (born 3 October 1978) is a Kazakhstani judoka. He competed in the men's lightweight event at the 2000 Summer Olympics.

References

1978 births
Living people
Kazakhstani male judoka
Olympic judoka of Kazakhstan
Judoka at the 2000 Summer Olympics
Judoka at the 2002 Asian Games
Asian Games competitors for Kazakhstan
20th-century Kazakhstani people
21st-century Kazakhstani people